Athens Municipal Airport is a city-owned public-use UNICOM airport located three nautical miles (6 km) southeast of the central business district of Athens, in Henderson County, Texas, United States. It is mostly used for general aviation. 

It is home to the Athens Jet Center which sells aircraft services and aviation and jet fuels.

Facilities and aircraft 
Athens Municipal Airport has one asphalt paved runway: 17/35 measuring 3,988 by 60 feet (1,216 x 18 m)

For the 12-month period ending September 17, 2008 the airport had 6,000 aircraft operations, an average of 16 per day: 67% local general aviation, 33% transient general aviation. At that time there were 23 aircraft based at this airport: 20 single-engine, 2 multi-engine, and 1 helicopter.

References

External links 
 
 

Airports in Texas
Transportation in Henderson County, Texas
Buildings and structures in Henderson County, Texas